942 Dakar, historia de una familia is a Spanish 2008 documentary film.

Synopsis
Bamba, a Senegalese man residing in Zaragoza, Spain,  goes back to Dakar, Senegal to spend some time with his family. Who are they? What worries them and how do they deal with their loved ones' absence?

References

External links 

2008 films
Spanish documentary films
2008 documentary films
Documentary films about families
Films shot in Senegal
2000s Spanish films